Kalininets is an urban locality (a work settlement) in the Naro-Fominsky District in Moscow Oblast, Russia. The town's name is a derivative form an unofficial name for a soldier of Taman Division, which is in turn named after Mikhail Ivanovich Kalinin (Russian: Михаи́л Ива́нович Кали́нин).

Location
Kalininets is along the Desna River which is a tributary of the Pakhra River.

Population, administrative and municipal status
Population:  9,304 (1979 Census)

As an administrative division, Kalininets was raised from a rural locality to the Work Settlement of Kalininets on July 11, 2006. Kalininets is the most populous settlement of the urban settlement Kalininets, which includes  the villages of Petrovskoye, Burtsevo, Novosusino, Selyatino, Sumino, Taraskovo, and Yushkovo.

Nearby Selyatino in the municipal entity of Selyatino provides local bus service. Selyatino has a hospital. Local Bus #55 provides service between the Hospital and nearby Aprelevka train station. Golitsyno has a hospital, too.

Transportation

Railway
Nearest railway stations or platform on the Moscow–Bryansk (Kiev, Ukraine) railway:
Alabino (Russian: Алабино), Selyatino (Russian: Селя́тино), and Aprelevka (Russian: Апре́левка)
From the south side of Selyatino train station, a local bus leaves for Kalininets with stops in Kalininets at the enlisted barracks KECh (Russian: КЭЧ or Квартирно-Эксплутационная Часть) along Ulitsa Fabrichnoi (Russian: улицей Фабричной), which has a laundry for the Army, often called Posyolok Milni or Solemn settlement (Russian: Посёлок Мыльный), and a stop at the officers houses (Russian: ДОС or Дома офицерского состава) in Taraskovo (Тарасково) which is near the highway in Kalininets.
From the north side of Selyatino train station or from north of the Alabino platform, a local bus for Kalininets has a stop in Alabino at Ulitsa Fabrichnoi (Russian: улицей Фабричной) and the Little Moscow Ring (Russian: Малом Московском кольце) route A-107.
From the south side of Aprelevka train station, local bus #55 leaves for Selyatino (Hospital). The Selyatino local bus terminal has local bus #60 (1190) Selyatino to Golitsyno with stops at Kalininets.
Nearest railway station or platform on the Moscow–Smolensk (Minsk, Belarus; Warsaw, Poland; Berlin, Germany; Paris, France) railway:
Golitsyno (Russian: Голи́цыно), and Malaya Vyzyomy (Russian: Ма́лая Вязёма or Ма́лые Вязёмы)
From the south side of Golitsyno train station, a local bus #60 (1190) leaves from Golitsyno for Selyatino with a stop at the officers houses (Russian: ДОС or Дома офицерского состава) in Taraskovo (Тарасково) which is near the highway in Kalininets. There is no stop at the enlisted barracks KECh (Russian: КЭЧ or Квартирно-Эксплутационная Часть) in Kalininets. To get the enlisted barracks KECh (Russian: КЭЧ or Квартирно-Эксплутационная Часть) in Kalininets, you must walk along Ulitsa Fabrichnoi (Russian: улицей Фабричной), which has a laundry for the Army, often called Posyolok Milni or Solemn settlement (Russian: Посёлок Мыльный).

Long distance Highway Coaches
Bus #39 (Russian: маршрут №39) from Kievskaya train station (Russian: Киевского вокзала), Odintsovo station (Russian: станции Одинцово), in Moscow provides service to nearby Golitsyno. From Golitysno, local bus #60 Selyatino to Golitsyno travels along the Little Moscow Ring (Russian: Малом Московском кольце) route A-107 and has stops in Kalininets.

Highway

Military
The town is home to several units of the 2nd Guards 'Taman' Motor Rifle Division in the Western Military District.

Notes

References

Notes

Sources

External links
 Official website of Kalininets
 Information about Kalininets

Urban-type settlements in Moscow Oblast